The 2017–18 Ranji Trophy was the 84th season of the Ranji Trophy, the first-class cricket tournament in India. It was contested by 28 teams divided into four groups, each containing seven teams. The top two teams from Group A progressed to the quarterfinals of the competition. Both of Hyderabad's first two matches were abandoned due to rain. Following the conclusion of the sixth round of fixtures, both Karnataka and Delhi had progressed to the knockout stage of the competition.

Teams
The following teams were placed in Group A, based on their average points in the previous three years:

 Assam
 Delhi
 Hyderabad
 Karnataka
 Maharashtra
 Railways
 Uttar Pradesh

Points table

Fixtures

Round 1

Round 2

Round 3

Round 4

Round 5

Round 6

Round 7

References

Ranji Trophy seasons
Ranji Trophy Trophy
Ranji Trophy
Ranji Trophy